Simon Robert Bailey  is a senior British police officer. Since 2013, he has been the Chief Constable of the Norfolk Constabulary. Bailey is also the National Police Chiefs' Council lead on child protection. He previously worked as a detective, and was involved in the investigation of the murder of Rosemary Nelson.

 he is leading Operation Hydrant, an umbrella investigation into multiple allegations of historic sexual abuse throughout the United Kingdom.

Bailey was awarded the Queen's Police Medal (QPM) in the 2016 New Year Honours. He was appointed Commander of the Order of the British Empire (CBE) in the 2022 Birthday Honours for services to policing and child protection.

Views
Bailey is concerned about the impact of austerity on Norfolk Constabulary, Bailey stated, “It would mean a reduction of 110 officers; it would take my numbers to a historic low of 1,400.  Community policing will be under threat. We will end up attending and investigating less, detecting less crime, and providing a service I don’t believe any chief constable would be happy with.”

Honours

References 

 

 
 
 

British Chief Constables
Living people
Date of birth missing (living people)
English recipients of the Queen's Police Medal
Year of birth missing (living people)
Commanders of the Order of the British Empire
Deputy Lieutenants of Norfolk